Tōdaijiyama Sword, also known as Tōdaijiyama Kofun Iron Sword (東大寺山古墳鉄剣 Tōdaijiyama  Kofun Tekken) in Japan is an ancient iron sword excavated in Tōdaijiyama kofun in Nara Prefecture, Japan. The sword was forged in China in the 2nd century and it's the oldest inscribed iron sword excavated in Japan to this day. Its inscription is the important source of the ancient diplomatic relations between China and Japan and its domestic politics.

Inscription
The original Chinese text is;
中平□□　五月丙午　造作支刀　百練清剛　上応星宿　□□□□

In English; 
This ornate (?) sword was manufactured in an auspicious day of the fifth month in the ... Zhongping era. The metal from which it has been wrought has been refined many times; it is pure ... [The fortune of the one who wears it] will accord with the stars ...

Interpretation
The Zhongping era is one of the Chinese traditional era name used by Emperor Ling of Han, corresponding between 184 and 189. In the Chinese historical book Records of Wei, which is part of the Records of the Three Kingdoms, Wa (Japan) had a large civil war in the period. It is assumed that the sword was bestowed by Emperor Ling on a king of Wa, though its detail is not yet unknown. Then the sword was passed to a local ruling family in the region, who constructed the Tōdaijiyama Kofun in the late 4th century.

See also
 Seven-Branched Sword
 Inariyama Sword
 Eta Funayama Sword
 Inaridai Sword

References

External links
Sword from Todaijiyama Tumulus with Inscription, Tokyo National Museum

Yayoi period*
Individual Japanese swords